Wayne Arthurs (born ) is a former politician in Ontario, Canada. He was a Liberal member of the Legislative Assembly of Ontario from 2003 to 2011 who represented the ridings of Pickering—Ajax—Uxbridge and Pickering—Scarborough East.

Background
Arthurs has a Bachelor of Arts degree from York University and a Bachelor of Education degree from the University of Toronto. He worked as a teacher and a guidance counsellor.

Politics
Arthurs was a member of the Pickering municipal council from 1982 to 1988. In 1988 he was elected as Mayor of the city. He defeated former Conservative MPP George Ashe. He stayed on as mayor until 2003. He was also a member of the Durham Regional Council.

Arthurs was elected to the Ontario legislature in the provincial election of 2003, defeating high-profile Progressive Conservative cabinet minister Janet Ecker by 1010 votes. Arthurs was still mayor of Pickering at the time of the election and was still registered for the municipal election that was being held later in 2003. Arthurs resigned as mayor soon after he won the election. He was re-elected in 2007.

During his time in office Arthurs remained on the backbench but served as Parliamentary Assistant to several ministries including Minister of Finance and Minister of Intergovernmental Affairs. In 2010 he announced his intention to retire from politics.

Electoral record

References

External links
 

1948 births
Mayors of places in Ontario
Ontario Liberal Party MPPs
Living people
People from Pickering, Ontario
University of Toronto alumni
21st-century Canadian politicians